Darian Rural District is a rural district (dehestan) in the Central District of Shiraz County, Fars Province, Iran. At the 2006 census, its population was 8,712, in 2,127 families.  The rural district has 12 villages.

References 

Rural Districts of Fars Province
Shiraz County